Degel is a town in northern Nigeria.  Once a part of the Hausa city-state of Gobir, Degel is particularly noted for being the home of Fulani Islamic reformer Usman dan Fodio from 1774 to 1804.  Dan Fodio built a large following in the area until, fearing his growing power, Yunfa of Gobir ordered him and his followers into exile, triggering the Fulani War.

Populated places in Sokoto State